The Tuscan regional election of 2005 took place on 3–4 April 2005.

Incumbent Claudio Martini (Democrats of the Left) defeated Alessandro Antichi (Forza Italia) by a landslide.

Electoral system
Tuscany uses its own legislation of 2004 to elect its Council. The councillors are elected in provincial constituencies by proportional representation using the largest remainder method with a Droop quota and close lists.

In this system parties are grouped in alliances, and the alliance which receives a plurality of votes elects all its candidates, its leader becoming the President of Tuscany.

In 2005 the number of the regional councilors rose to 65 from 50.

Parties and candidates

Results
2005 election led to the return to the guide of the Region, for its second consecutive term, Claudio Martini, supported by the center-left coalition.

If the mechanisms of electoral law generated a Regional Council very similar to the incumbent one, popular vote marked a significant increase in the gap between the two sides, which was almost halved. The same plurality party, Democrats of the Left in coalition with other parties in The Olive Tree, increased of more than one hundred thousand preferences. The election was also the test for a list that led, within two years, to the national foundation of a new political entity, the Democratic Party.

Like 1995 election, Communist Refoundation Party run lonely with its candidate.

2005 elections in Italy
2005 regional election
April 2005 events in Europe
2005